William Burns Fulton (December 23, 1877 – May 25, 1960) was an American Democratic politician who served as a member of the Virginia House of Delegates, representing the counties of Buchanan, Dickenson, and Wise.

References

External links

Democratic Party members of the Virginia House of Delegates
1877 births
1960 deaths
People from Wise, Virginia